Until 1 January 2007 Sønderhald municipality was a municipality (Danish, kommune) in the former Aarhus County in the eastern part of the Jutland peninsula (Djurs) in central Denmark.  It covered an area of 138 km2, and had a total population of 8.503 (2005).  Its last mayor was Kirsten Wyrtz, a member of the Social Democrats (Socialdemokraterne) political party. The site of its municipal council was Auning.  Other towns in the municipality were Assentoft, Uggelhuse, and Øster Alling.

 Auning Parish
 Essenbæk Parish
 Fausing Parish
 Hørning Parish
 Vester Alling Parish
 Virring Parish
 Årslev Parish
 Øster Alling Parish

Sønderhald municipality ceased to exist due to Kommunalreformen ("The Municipality Reform" of 2007).  The eastern part of the municipality was combined with Nørre Djurs, Rougsø and Grenaa municipalities to form the new Norddjurs municipality. This created a municipality with an area of 661 km2 and a total population of 34,382 (2005).  The new municipality belongs to Region Midtjylland ("Mid-Jutland Region"). The remainder was incorporated into an enlarged Randers municipality along with Randers, Nørhald, and Purhus municipalities, as well as parts of Mariager and Langå.

Attractions
 Old Estrup, Jutland's Estate Museum (Gammel Estrup Jyllands Herregårdsmuseum)

External links 
 Norddjurs municipality's official website (Danish only)
 Randers municipality's official website (Danish only)

References 
 Municipal statistics: NetBorger Kommunefakta, delivered from KMD aka Kommunedata (Municipal Data)
 Municipal mergers and neighbors: Eniro new municipalities map

Former municipalities of Denmark
Randers Municipality